is a Japanese visual novel developed by Windmill. It was first released as an eroge for Microsoft Windows on January 30, 2009, and followed by an all-ages release scheduled for the PlayStation Portable. The gameplay in Shukufuku no Campanella follows a linear plot line, which takes place in the fictional city of Ert'Aria, and offers pre-determined scenarios with courses of interaction.

Shukufuku no Campanella has received several transitions to other media. There has been two manga adaptations: the first is serialized in the comic magazine Comptiq, and the second is serialized in Monthly Comic Alive. An anime adaptation was also produced by AIC, and began its Japanese broadcast on July 2, 2010. Two manga anthologies, five light novels, and two Internet radio shows have also been produced.

Plot

Story
Ert'Aria, a port city known as the "treasury of the world" is preparing for a harvest festival. Leicester Maycraft, the young item engineer of the Oasis clan, follows a shooting star of eru, a mystical energy, to where it lands. There he discovers a young girl who calls him her father and their adventures begin.

Characters

Main characters

 (anime)
He is the Oasis clan's best (only?) item engineer and Minette's "papa". He is a competent swordsman as well. He is shown to have a calm and patient personality, as he takes the hijinx of the girls around him in stride.

 (PC), Mai Kadowaki (PSP, anime)
She is an automata puppet who was awoken by an eru meteor and immediately considered Leicester to be her papa, due to him being the first man she saw. She appears to be about 10 years old and has an innocent and caring personality. It is revealed that she was created by Mise Altoise.

 (PC), Kimiko Koyama (PSP, anime)
Carina is the daughter of the rulers of the city and Leicester's childhood friend. She has a crush on him and is extremely jealous when he interacts with other girls. Carina is a mage and she uses a paddle-like staff, Montecchia, which Leicester created for her, to fly around town as she has a delicate constitution. She lives in a mansion near the sea and is part of Clan Oasis.

 (PC), Asami Imai (PSP, anime)
Chelsea is one of the Holy Knights and a friend of Shelley's. She has a horrible sense of direction and is able to lose herself even if her destination is right in front of her. She joins Clan Oasis and over the course of their adventures, she develops feelings for Leicester.

 (PC), Kaori Mizuhashi (PSP, anime)
Agnes is a traveling puppeteer whose many automata puppets perform circus acts for the public. Agnes also has a huge appetite and she loves desserts. She is Mise Altoise's daughter and apprentice and is traveling the world to find her. She, like Chelsea, develops feelings for Leicester.

 (PC), Michiru Yuimoto (PSP, anime)
Nina is Clan Oasis' maid. She never goes on any quests herself but instead relays requests to the other members and takes care of the household. She is rarely seen outside of their home.

 (PC), Keiji Fujiwara (PSP, anime)
The only other male member of Clan Oasis, he is a close friend of Leicester's and carries a heavy two handed axe as his weapon of choice.

 (PC), Ari Yunohara (PSP, anime)
The elder twin of the Tortilla sisters, Salsa is usually left taking the fall or blame for Ritos' actions. The twins are the main source of comic relief throughout the series. Salsa has feelings for Leicester and often fantasizes about him.

 (PC), Mai Gotō (PSP, anime)
Ritos is the younger of the Tortilla twins. Though she acts clueless most of the time, Ritos has a scheming personality and often withholds important information about her plans from her sister, until the last second. This inevitably leaves her sister, Salsa, to take the blame, fall for traps, or take an attack from an enemy, while she escapes just in time. She is aware of Salsa's feelings for Leicester and when speaking with or about Leicester, she makes heavy use of innuendo which sets her sister off and which Leicester is able to ignore, much to her amazement.

Supporting characters

 (PC), Naoko Takano (PSP, anime)
Leicester's mother who looks younger than she is and acts very affectionately toward him - so much so, that she has been mistaken for his older sister. She has a tendency to tease her son and the girls around him.

 (PC), Hiroki Yasumoto (PSP, anime)
He is Leicester's father and a friend of the puppeteer, Mise Altoise, who created of Minette.

 (PC), Hiroya Ishimaru (PSP, anime)
He is Carina's father and Archduke of Ert' Aria. He has a fondness for young girls for which Carina constantly berates him.

 (PC), Satomi Kōrogi (PSP, anime)
She is Carina's mother who has a calm and regal presence.

 (PC), Akiko Hasegawa (PSP, anime)
She is a dragon's avatar, whom Leicester and the others encounter when they are asked to investigate a shadow dragon. After dealing with the shadow dragon she remains friendly with Clan Oasis. Like Chelsea, she has a terrible sense of direction; when asked to guide Chelsea, the two were not seen until nightfall.

 (PC), Satomi Kōrogi (PSP, anime)
Tango is a talking cat puppet that Agnes created and which participates in her shows. In contrast to her other puppets, Tango often acts as a sympathetic ear for Agnes.

 (PC), Hiroki Yasumoto (PSP, anime)
A Rock machine that Salsa built. Is it later revealed that Ritos installed Leicester's cheer up attitude in Golem to cheer the girl sup. (This was revealed when Golem cheers up Chelsea.) It also blushes when around Leicester.

 (PC), Hiromi Hirata (PSP, anime)
Carina's magic staff.

 (PC), Oma Ichimura (PSP, anime)
She is Minette's friend whom she meets in episode 5. Miriam is polite and shy and she relies on Minette to bring her stories of the outside world because her fragile body does not allow her to travel. It revealed that she is related to Aberdeen. Still later, it is revealed that she is an automata like Minette, but created by Roland to house the spirit of his sister - a hidden art within the Roland clan thought to be lost.

 (PC), Noriaki Sugiyama (PSP, anime)
He is a boy with white hair and a former colleague of Agnes. He is after Minette's core in order to save the automata he created for his sister, Miriam.

 (PC), Yūko Gotō (PSP, anime)
A female automata who serves under Aberdeen. She does whatever her "master" tells her and is very strong - able block Nick's axe with just her bare hand. She also is able to move in incredible speeds with no effort and is excellent in manipulating the Eru (Ale) energy stored inside her body.

 (PC), Hiromi Hirata (PSP, anime)
Agnes's "maitresse" (mentor) and mother. She has been missing for several years and neither her daughter nor her friends know where she is.

Music
The game opening uses the same name as the title, "Shukufuku no Campanella" (祝福のカンパネラ), a duet by Hiromi Satou & NANA.

The anime series' first opening theme for the anime is "Shiawase wa Yori Tsuki Takaku" (シアワセは月より高く) by Aki Misato used from episodes two to seven, and nine to eleven; it was also the ending theme for episode twelve. The single was released on July 23, 2010. The second opening theme is "Yume no Preparation" (夢のpreparation, lit. "A Dream's Preparation") by Anri Yunohara, Mai Gotō, and Hiroki Yasumoto. The first ending theme for the anime is "Mirai Kaikisen" (未来回帰線) by Miyuki Hashimoto, used from episodes one to eight; it was also used as the opening for episode twelve. The single was released on August 23, 2010. The second ending theme is "AMELIA" by Yuko Gotō, used from episodes nine to eleven.

Anime
Right Stuf Inc. has licensed the series for a DVD release in North America in 2014 under its Lucky Penny label.

Episode list

References

External links
 Windmill Official Website 
  
  
 Blessing of the Campanella - The Official Anime Website from FUNimation
 
 

2009 video games
Anime International Company
Bishōjo games
Eroge
Funimation
Harem anime and manga
Harem video games
Kadokawa Shoten manga
Media Factory manga
PlayStation Portable games
Seinen manga
Visual novels
Video games developed in Japan
Windows games